Atul Sharma (Born 9 May 1961) is a multiple-award-winning music composer, producer, sitarist, singer and judge on the popular TV show "Voice of Punjab". He is known for being one of the pioneers of Bhangra and Punjabi pop/folk music, and has composed music for over 5000 music albums and many Punjabi and Hindi films. He has given many global hits like "Yaar Bolda", "Dupatta Tera Satt Rang Da", "Mukhda Dekh ke", "Jatti", "Mitraan Da Naa Chalda" etc. He has also composed and designed music for various theatre productions and has worked with eminent directors and play writes. Based out of Chandigarh, he has been one of the foremost contributors in setting up the Punjabi music industry, and the emergence of recording studios in North India. 

Currently he is performing with his band The Red Brick House, which includes his son Sharang, and his wife Shivani Sharma. He is also the chairman of the Chandigarh Sangeet Natak Akademi.

Early life and musical training

Atul Sharma started his musical education at early age, and received vocal training in Indian Classical Music from Mr. P.D. Chandan in Kalka (Haryana, India) at the age of 11. While continuing his vocal training, he started learning the Sitar from Mr. Jitender Kumar in Chandigarh. He then went on to do his Masters in both Hindustani Vocal and Hindustani Instrumental music from Panjab University, Chandigarh. He also did a Diploma in "Indian Theatre" from the Department of Indian theatre, Panjab University, Chandigarh. During his education, he played numerous concerts won multiple inter-college competitions for his vocals and sitar.

After finishing his masters, he taught Indian classical music at the Panjab University for seven years, before becoming a full-time music composer.

Career

Punjabi music

He started composing music in the early 1980s, and his first Punjabi album was of the singer Hakam Sufi, titled "Mela Yaaran Da". From there he went on to compose music for numerous albums for artistes like Hans Raj Hans, Sardool Sikander, Kuldip Manak, Gurdas Maan, as well as Punjabi movies like "Jatt Jeaona Mour" (1991) "Badla Jatti Da" (1991), delivering many multi platinum selling albums on the way.

Surjit Bindrakhia

During this time, he mentored a then young and raw singer Surjit Bindrakhia. Along with the lyricist Samsher Singh Sandhu, the three formed perhaps one of most legendary and finest team in Punjabi music. Starting from Bindrakhia's first album "Munda Ki Mangda", which became widely popular in Punjab, the trio delivered some of Punjabi music's most popular music ever. The Success of the first album carried forward with the massive hit "Bas Kar Bas Kar" in 1992, and then "Dupatta Tera Satt Rang Da" in 1994 which established Bindrakhia as the global superstar of Punjabi Music. The single "Dupatta Tera Satt Rang Da" went on to top the UK music Charts for numerous weeks, and became one of the first Punjabi songs to sell a million copies in the UK. For the same album, Atul Sharma was presented a platinum record at the Wembley Arena in the honour of the albums record breaking success. This success was followed by further hits like "Lakk tunu tunu", "Mukhda deke ke", "Billiyan Akhiyan", "Saanu tedi tedi takhdi tun", "Peke hunde maawan naal" and "Yaar Bolda", a song that has reached a cult status in Punjabi folk music the world over.

Almost all the albums produced by this trio, went on to achieve commercial success in India as well as the Western markets of the UK, Canada, and the US. Their hugely successful trio, delivered record sales of over 250 million copies in total, out of which over 100 million came from outside India.

Harjit Harman

Similar to his success with Bindrakhia, Atul Sharma mentored Harjit Harman and their partnership with lyricist Pargat Singh has yielded some of the biggest hits in recent history. The album "Punjebaan" received great commercial as well as well critical success, with the Title track "Punjebaan" and "Mitran da naa chalda" becoming super-hits all over the world. His further albums were also highly acclaimed and commercially successful with "Hoor", "Mundri", "Jhanjhar", and the most recent single "Jatti" being the stand out records. He received the award for the "Best Music Director" at PTC Music Awards for the song "Mitran da naa chalda" in 2005, and then for the song "Jatti" in 2015. "Jatti" was also given the award for the "Best Folk Oriented Song".

Other artistes

Apart from his association with Bindrakhia and Harjit Harman, Atul Sharma has composed music for nearly all the eminent artistes like:

 Kuldip Manak
 Surinder Shinda
 Gurdas Maan
 Hans Raj Hans
 Labh Janjua
 Mohammad Sadiq, Ranjit Kaur
 Sardool Sikander, Amar Noori
 Malkit Singh
 Narinder Biba
 Jagmohan Kaur
 Dolly Guleria
 Manmohan Waris
 Sarbjit Cheema
 Harbhajan Mann
 Durga Rangila
 Satwinder Bugga
 Bhagwant Mann
 Satinder Bitti
 Jaspinder Narula
 Surjit Khan
 Gurj Sidhu

He has also been responsible mentoring and for giving the initial opportunity to emerging talents like:

 Yudhvir Manak
 Gippy Grewal
 Master Saleem
 Avtar Singh Kang
 Miss Pooja
 Kamal Khan
 Roshan Prince
 Preet Harpal

to name a few.

Theatre music

Having studied Indian Theatre at the reputed "Department of Indian Theatre" in Panjab University, Chandigarh, Atul Sharma has always been devoted to contributing to theatre. He was worked with, and composed soundtracks and music for some of the accomplished and eminent play-writes and directors in India, including the National award-winning play writes like Dr. Atamjit Singh. The music he gave for Shiv Kumar Batalvi's magnum opus Luna is considered to be a master piece in theatre music

Contribution to the recording industry in Punjab

During this time, he also spearheaded a sea change in the Punjabi music industry in Chandigarh, and other parts of Punjab by bringing modern recording techniques to studios that were previously unavailable and unknown in the region. He was also one of the first Punjabi composers to use to written sheet music for his musicians as a way of organising and making the industry more professional, while also encouraging local indigenous musicians of the region to come forth to the studios and record.

In 2001 he started his own audio recording studio in Chandigarh called "Saffron Touch" which became one of the first studios to adapt to modern digital recording methods and equipments. The studio has also become one of the most popular studios for Artistes, Musicians, Film Directors from Bollywood as well as all over the world.

Awards and honours

 Best Music Director - PTC Punjabi Music Awards, 2005
 "Starcity Punjab da Superstar" - ETC Punjabi & Zee Punjabi - 2006
 Best Music Director - PTC Punjabi Music Awards, 2015
 Suran da Shehenshah - PTC Punjabi Music Awards, 2015

References

1961 births
Punjabi music
Indian male composers
Sitar players
Punjabi artists
Musicians from Chandigarh
Living people